Energy (formerly known as Trance Energy) was a Dutch trance event featuring trance music DJs from around the world. It was organized by ID&T and was held since 1999 in various venues in the Netherlands.

History
The event was founded in 1999. Traditionally, there was a "small" edition and a big edition each year. In 2002, the small edition failed to sell out its 20,000-person ticket capacity (only 15,000 tickets were sold) and thereafter, Trance Energy was only held once annually, at the Jaarbeurs convention center in Utrecht, where it has been sold out each year up to 2009. The festival gained "cult" status among trance fans. In 2010, it failed to sell out by slight margins since it was organized on Easter week end and this was problematic for some foreign visitors (especially from Poland).

In 2011, ID&T changed the concept and renamed the festival to "Energy the network", opening the festival to other genres from Trance only. The change was announced in September 2010, and labelled as a simple "name change". This change caused controversy and was very negatively greeted on internet forums. Meanwhile, one ID&T competitor launched a Trance only festival in the Netherlands. As a result, attendance declined steadily with edition 2011 and 2012 being not sold out by large margins. (Only half of 2012 tickets were sold). In 2013, the event was moved to the Ziggo Dome, a smaller venue in Amsterdam and still it failed to sell out. There has been no announcement of a 2014 edition up to this date. Yet ID&T has not announced cancellation of the event like they usually do.

While audience in the first years was mostly Dutch, there were subsequently many international visitors, mainly from the European Union but sometimes from other areas around the world. This is due to the festival earning worldwide fame thanks to bootlegs of DJ mixes and some official videos of former editions. At the 2010 edition, it has been quoted by ID&T that more than 40% of the audience was not Dutch.

In 2017, ID&T announced the return of Trance Energy.

Description of the Event 

Past 2003 editions of Trance Energy usually focus on three stages located in different halls of the Jaarbeurs convention center and connected by corridors :

 The "Mainstage" (capacity : 20,000 people) where headliner DJs of the night do their sets. The sets are usually between one and two hours long. Impressive light shows with lasers, lights and fireworks are featured along with some acts (Dancers, Live acts, DJ sets, etc...). The setup is quite typical of a "classic" trance party: Minimal decorations with most of the ambience being created by lights and the structural elements used to rig them. Only the size makes it different.
 The "Madhouse" (capacity : 5,000 people) which features more house and club music. This stage has sometimes been criticized by some of the visitors who find the music played there too distant from the "trance" theme of the event.
 An alternate stage whose name changes each year (capacity : 5,000 people) where edgier trance than on the mainstage is played. This stage often features very famous names who are able to take more risks musically speaking than what they would be allowed on the mainstage.

Since 2007, a fourth stage has been added, the "Hard Stage" featuring harder derivatives of Trance Music.
In 2009, students of the Utrecht School for the Arts were asked to design the entrance of the festival. They created a multi-disciplinary entrance, where interactivity, game-elements, video, fashion and music came together.

Trance Energy toured Australia in 2009.  The tour attracted controversy after police shut down the Melbourne leg early due to 26 overdoses.

History of editions 

Here is the list of Trance Energy editions :

See also
List of electronic music festivals

References

External links

Official site
The official ID&T website
Report about Trance Energy 2010

Music festivals established in 1999
Trance festivals
Electronic music festivals in the Netherlands